Lucius Cornelius Lentulus was a consul of the Roman Republic in 199 BC with Publius Villius Tappulus as his colleague.

He was brother of Gnaeus Cornelius Lentulus, the consul of 201 BC.

Cornelius Lentulus achieved the praetorship in 211 BC and served in Sardinia. He then succeeded Scipio Africanus as proconsul in Spain, though he was denied a triumph upon his return in 200 BC. He was rewarded by becoming consul in the following year. He died in 173 BC.

References 

3rd-century BC births
173 BC deaths
3rd-century BC Romans
2nd-century BC Roman consuls
Ancient Roman generals
Lucius
Roman patricians